Music Makers or We Are the Music Makers may refer to:

Music

Classical
 The Music Makers (Elgar), a musical setting of O'Shaughnessy's poem composed by Edward Elgar in 1912
 The Music Makers, a setting of the same poem by Zoltán Kodály
 The Music-Makers, a concert overture for band after the same poem by Alfred Reed

Bands
 Music Makers (Saint Kitts and Nevis band), a 1940s Canadian Carnival band
 The Music Makers, the original name of the American recording group MFSB
 We Are the Music Makers (band), an American new prog band
 Harry James and His Music Makers, a big band led by Harry James in the 1930s and 1940s
 Blue Ridge Music Makers, an act associated with old-time fiddle player Charlie Bowman

Albums
 Music Makers (album), a 1986 album by Helen Merrill
 We Are the Music Makers, a 2005 album by Joy Electric

Songs
 "Music Makers", a 1940s big band piece by Al Lerner and Harry James
 "We Are the Music Makers," a track on Aphex Twin's album Selected Ambient Works 85–92
 "We Are the Music Makers," a song by Scarling. on the 2005 album So Long, Scarecrow

Other
 Music Makers (television series)
 Ode (poem), an 1874 poem by English poet Arthur O'Shaughnessy that begins: "We are the music makers."

See also
 Music Maker (disambiguation)